Critical Assembly is a 2003 television film directed by Eric Laneuville. It stars Katherine Heigl and Kerr Smith.

Plot
For political reasons, two college students build a nuclear device which is then stolen by another student. It ends up in the hands of a terrorist, so the device's creators team up with an FBI agent to find it.

Cast
Katherine Heigl as Aizy Hayward 
Kerr Smith as Bobby Damon
J. August Richards as Allan Marshall
Jeff Roop as Roger 'Stoop' Stupak
Christopher Kennedy as Major Matt Crowl

References

External links

2003 films
2003 television films
American action television films
Films directed by Eric Laneuville
Films scored by Mark Snow
2003 action films
2000s English-language films